Michelle Pantoliano (born May 29, 1974 in Queens, New York City, New York, USA) is an American television host, known as former Naked News anchor (2002–2005). She is originally from New York. She received a Broadcast & Communications degree from the State University of New York at Oswego.

She began her broadcast career as a radio show host in Pomona, New York. Soon after, she hired on as a page at NBC-TV in New York City, which she worked with CNBC's Ron Insana and Sue Herrera and also worked as a reporter for a cable television program in the New Jersey-New York area.

She joined Naked News in January 2002 as host of the "Entertainment" segment. Later on, she appeared once a week as host of the "Locker Talk" segment. However, these clips are rebroadcasts of segments she shot while she was an active member of the reporting team.

She now runs a real estate business with her husband in Florida.

References

External links 
 michellepantoliano.com
 Naked News website
 Fan Group at Yahoo! Groups
 
 Highbeam.com article with more information about Pantoliano
 Queens Tribune article about Pantoliano's start at Naked News

American women journalists
American people of Italian descent
Living people
1974 births
21st-century American women